In functional analysis, a branch of mathematics, the algebraic interior or radial kernel of a subset of a vector space is a refinement of the concept of the interior.

Definition

Assume that  is a subset of a vector space  
This last condition can also be written as  where the set 
 
That is to say, it is the subset of points contained in a given set with respect to which it is radial points of the set.  

Algebraic closure

A point  is said to be  from a subset  if there exists some  such that the line segment  is contained in  

Algebraic Interior (Core)

If  is non-empty, then these additional subsets are also useful for the statements of many theorems in convex functional analysis (such as the Ursescu theorem):

Examples

If  then  but  and

Properties of core

Suppose  
 In general,  But if  is a convex set then:
  and
 for all  then 
  is an absorbing subset of a real vector space if and only if 
 
  if 

Both the core and the algebraic closure of a convex set are again convex. 
If  is convex,  and  then the line segment  is contained in

Relation to topological interior

Let  be a topological vector space,  denote the interior operator, and  then: 
 
 If  is convex with non-empty interior, then 

Relative algebraic interior

Relative interior

 

Quasi relative interior

In a Hausdorff finite dimensional topological vector space,

See also

Reference

Bibliography

  
  
  
  
  

Convex analysis
Functional analysis
Mathematical analysis
Topology